A special election for Pennsylvania's 18th congressional district was held on March 13, 2018, following the resignation of Republican Representative Tim Murphy. Murphy, who held the seat since January 3, 2003, declared his intent to resign on October 5, 2017, and vacated his seat on October 21 that year. Democrat Conor Lamb defeated Republican Rick Saccone 49.86% to 49.53%. Saccone conceded the race eight days after the election.

Background
Eight-term incumbent Republican U.S. Representative Tim Murphy was involved in a sex scandal consisting of his allegedly having extramarital sexual relations with a woman and then asking her to have an abortion. This was particularly damaging because Murphy identifies as a pro-life politician. Murphy subsequently announced that he was resigning and that he would leave office on October 21.

Primary elections were not held in the race. Instead, nominees were chosen by each party. The Republican Party held a special convention on November 11, 2017, to choose a nominee through a conferee process involving 215 local Republican activists. The Democratic Party held their nominating convention on November 19, 2017. The Libertarian Party of Allegheny County and the Libertarian Party of Washington County nominated a candidate via party caucus.

At the time, Pennsylvania's 18th Congressional District was located in Western Pennsylvania and bordered the state of West Virginia. It included portions of Greene, Washington, Allegheny and Westmoreland counties. The district had a Cook PVI score of R+11.  This was the last election for Pennsylvania's 18th congressional district held under the configuration made in 2011 by the Pennsylvania Legislature as new districts have been drawn in accordance with the ruling of the state supreme court in League of Women Voters v. Commonwealth of Pennsylvania and came into effect for the main 2018 congressional elections in November. The bulk of the old 18th became the 14th District.

Republican conferee meeting

Candidates

Declared
 Guy Reschenthaler, state senator
 Rick Saccone, state representative
 Kim Ward, state senator

Failed to qualify
 George Karpacs, Pennsylvania College Access Program board member

Withdrew
 Jason Ortitay, state representative

Results

Democratic convention

Candidates

Declared
 Rueben Brock, psychologist and California University of Pennsylvania assistant professor
 Gina Cerilli, Westmoreland County Commissioner
 Mike Crossey, former Allegheny County Councillor and former teacher's union official
 Pam Iovino, former Assistant Department of Veterans Affairs Secretary
 Conor Lamb, former Assistant United States Attorney for the Western District of Pennsylvania
 Keith Seewald, small business owner and author
 Bob Solomon, physician

Declined
 Brandon Neuman, state representative
 Dan Miller, state representative

Results

Libertarian Party nomination
The Libertarian candidate was Pittsburgh attorney Drew Gray Miller.
Prior to this however, a primary candidate was Philip Moses, a high school government teacher. Moses ended his campaign in early 2018.

General election

Candidates
 Rick Saccone (Republican), state representative
 Conor Lamb (Democratic), former Assistant United States Attorney for the Western District of Pennsylvania
 Drew Gray Miller (Libertarian), former Legal Counsel to the Majority Whip of the Pennsylvania Senate
Official Sample Ballot

Predictions

Campaign
The major party candidates were Republican Rick Saccone and Democrat Conor Lamb, in a district that Donald Trump carried by almost 20 points in the 2016 presidential election. The special election attracted national attention and was seen by many political analysts and commentators as a bellwether on the popularity of Donald Trump, Trump's tariffs on steel and aluminum imports, and the Republican Party. Saccone said the special election was a referendum on Trump's presidency and called himself "Trump before Trump was Trump". Prominent Republicans including Donald Trump (twice), Donald Trump Jr., Ivanka Trump, and Mike Pence came to the state to campaign for Saccone. The district was contested by a third-party candidate (Libertarian Drew Gray Miller) for the first time since 1996.

Campaign funding
Republicans and aligned groups spent more than twice as much as Democrats and aligned groups on the special election. Although Lamb's campaign fund raised more than Saccone's campaign fund, Saccone benefited from far more spending by outside groups than Lamb.

The Republican Party and outside pro-Republican "independent expenditure" groups spent almost $10.7 million to support Saccone or oppose Lamb in the campaign, while $2.6 million in independent expenditures was spent in support of Lamb. Fourteen outside groups (seven Republican, seven Democrat) comprised over 95% of the spending. For the Republican side, the major groups spending money on Saccone's behalf were Paul Ryan's Congressional Leadership Fund, the National Republican Congressional Committee, the Republican National Committee, and the pro-Trump groups America First Action and 45Committee. For the Democratic side, the major groups spending money on Lamb's behalf were the Democratic Congressional Campaign Committee, Patriot Majority PAC, and the VoteVets.org Action Fund.

Debates
KDKA-TV hosted the first debate on February 19, 2018. WTAE-TV hosted the second and final debate on March 3, 2018, at 7 PM EST. The debate was hosted live by WTAE-TV along with the League of Women Voters of Greater Pittsburgh.

Endorsements

Polling 
{| class="wikitable"
|- valign=bottom
! Poll source
! Date(s)administered
! Samplesize
! Marginof error
! style="width:100px;"| RickSaccone (R)
! style="width:100px;"| ConorLamb (D)
! Other
! Undecided
|-
| Monmouth University
| align=center| March 8–11, 2018
| align=center| 372
| align=center| ± 5.1%
| align=center| 45%
|  align=center| 51%
| align=center| 1%
| align=center| 3%
|-
| RABA Research
| align=center| March 6–8, 2018
| align=center| 707
| align=center| ± 3.7%
| align=center| 44%
|  align=center| 48%
| align=center| –
| align=center| 9%
|-
| Gravis Marketing
| align=center| March 1–5, 2018
| align=center| 911
| align=center| ± 3.3%
|  align=center| 45%
| align=center| 42%
| align=center| –
| align=center| 13%
|-
| Emerson College
| align=center| March 1–3, 2018
| align=center| 474
| align=center| ± 4.8%
| align=center| 45%
|  align=center| 48%
| align=center| –
| align=center| 7%
|-
| Gravis Marketing
| align=center| February 13–15, 2018
| align=center| 602
| align=center| ± 4.2%
|  align=center| 45%
| align=center| 40%
| align=center| –
| align=center| 15%
|-
| Monmouth University
| align=center| February 12–14, 2018
| align=center| 320
| align=center| ± 5.5%
|  align=center| 49%
| align=center| 46%
| align=center| 1%
| align=center| 4%
|-
| DFM Research (D) 
| align=center| January 18–19, 2018
| align=center| 384
| align=center| ± 5.0%
|  align=center| 41%
| align=center| 38%
| align=center| –
| align=center| 21%
|-
| Gravis Marketing
| align=center| January 3–5, 2018
| align=center| 513
| align=center| ± 4.3%
|  align=center| 46%
| align=center| 34%
| align=center| –
| align=center| 20%

Results 

Lamb declared victory just after midnight on March 14. With all precincts reporting, Lamb led Saccone by 627 votes, a margin of 0.2 percent. NBC News declared Lamb the apparent winner early on the morning of March 14, based on the remaining absentee ballots from Washington County. The New York Times followed suit later that afternoon. A few other outlets declared Lamb the winner in what has been described as "a major upset", but others withheld judgment, citing the closeness of the race and the likelihood of a recount. Saccone conceded the race to Lamb on March 21, the day that the last votes were counted. Allegheny County certified its election results on April 2, making Conor Lamb's victory official. He was sworn in on April 12. 

Lamb's victory came primarily on the strength of winning the Allegheny County portion of the district by almost 15,400 votes, as he lost the rest of the district by 14,700 votes.

Results by county

See also

 List of close election results
 List of special elections to the United States House of Representatives
 United States House of Representatives elections in Pennsylvania, 2016
 Pennsylvania's 12th congressional district special election, 2010

External links
 Conor Lamb (D) for Congress
 Rick Saccone (R) for Congress

References

Pennsylvania 2018 18
Pennsylvania 2018 18
2018 18 Special
Pennsylvania 18 Special
United States House of Representatives 18 Special
United States House of Representatives 2018 18
March 2018 events in the United States